Croatian science fiction comprises books and films in the fiction genre produced all across Croatia.

Authors

 Ivo Brešan
 Zoran Krušvar
 Darko Macan
 Krešimir Mišak
 Dalibor Perković
 Milan Šufflay
 Aleksandar Žiljak
 Martina Majcen

Films
 Izbavitelj  (1977)
 Visitors from the Galaxy (1981)
 Infection (2003)
 Reptiloid (2013)

Artists
 Aleksandar Žiljak

Awards
SFERA Award

Magazines and annual publications
 Sirius (1976 - 1989)
Futura (1992 - 2005)

Fandom
Fandom has been around in Croatia since the 1976, when the SFera SF society was established. There are a number of conventions, societies, and fanzines.

Conventions
SFeraKon (http://sferakon.org/)
IstraKon (https://web.archive.org/web/20161101121604/http://www.istrakon.hr/)
RiKon (http://www.3zmaj.hr/rikon/)
Liburnicon (former Abbacon) (http://www.liburnicon.org)

Societies
SFera (http://www.sfera.hr)
3. Zmaj (http://www.3zmaj.hr)
U.R.S.A. Maior (http://www.medvjed.com)
U.S.S. Croatia (http://www.usscroatia.hr)
Mos Croatia Spaceport (https://web.archive.org/web/20110927094801/http://www.starwars.hr/)
Ognjeni Mač (https://web.archive.org/web/20160111002037/http://larp.hr/)
Klub Titan Atlas (http://klubtitanatlas.hr/)

Fanzines
Parsek (http://parsek.sfera.hr)
Via Galactica (http://viagalactica.com)
NOSF (http://nosf.net)
Eridan (http://www.3zmaj.hr/eridan/)
The Void Fanzin (http://thevoidfanzin.wordpress.com/)

Liburnicon
Liburnicon is a festival for fans of science fiction, fantasy, advanced science, history and mythology, organised by the association "Kulturni front". Liburnicon is held in Opatija, a seaside town situated under the Učka mountain on the shore of northern Adriatic.

The first Liburnicon was held in 2006, under the name Abbacon. It was a gathering of several dozen science fiction and fantasy fans from Opatija and the surrounding region. Initially, Liburnicon was conceived as a small summer convention in the Liburnia region, and over time it developed into a festival that also offers musical, artistic, and excursion content.

References